Vera Armstrong  MBE (1904 - 1992) was a British children's author and member of the Girl Guide movement for six decades.

Personal life
Mary Vera Marshall was born in Huddersfield on 22 April 1904, the second child of Catherine Elsie and William Lawrence Wright Marshall. She was baptised on 20 July 1904 in Llanfairfechan, Wales. She attended the Queen Anne Grammar School for Girls in York. She married Richard Shirley Tain, a soldier in the Royal Engineers, in Cheltenham in 1934. By 1946 her marriage had ended and she had married Brigadier Edward Francis Egerton Armstrong CBE (1890-1995). She died in Gloucestershire on 19 April 1992.

Girl Guide career
Armstrong was a Guide Captain in Hull by 1933, and in 1947 she became the first District Commissioner of the newly created Paddington District, where her “untiring energies” ensured that Paddington was in the “van of Girl Guiding in London”. In 1948 she was working at Girl Guide Headquarters.
When her husband's army role took them both to India in September 1949, she resigned her position in the UK, with the intention to take up Guiding on her arrival in India.

In the 1950s she edited a Girl Guide's educational film, The Wider World, and became a member of the Rangers Overseas National Committee. In 1957 she made a film at the International Camp in Windsor Great Park to mark the centenary of the birth of Lord Baden-Powell. From 1954 – 1966 she edited the Girl Guide magazine, The Trefoil.

While working at Girl Guide Headquarters in 1964, she founded the Guide Friendship Fund (GFF), which continues to this day to offer financial help to Guides overseas. In the early 1970s she was Honorary Secretary of the fund. She was also an Overseas representative on the International Committee at the Guides’ Commonwealth Headquarters. In 1984 she became an early member of the Olave Baden-Powell Society, set up in 1983 to support the mission of World Association of Girl Guides and Girl Scouts (WAGGGS) through fundraising and mentorship of young leaders. In 1986 she was Mid-Gloucestershire Guides Divisional President.

In lieu of flowers at her funeral, Armstrong asked for donations to the Girl Guides Association.

Author
She published a range of books, mostly although not exclusively about Guiding, under her maiden name, Vera M Marshall, and her second married name, M Vera Armstrong.

 Arithmetic for Girls (1930) with Enid Mary Barratt. Edited by H E J Curzon
 The Quest of the Sleuth Patrol (1931)
 Tracks to Adventure: A Series of Tracking Adventures (1932)
 Tracks to the Queen's Guide (1948)
 Biddy The Brownie (1949) Illustrated by Hilda Boswell
 Twenty Tales (1949)
 Rival Camps (1950)
 Maris of Glenside (1953)
 Trefoil Tales: True Stories of how the Girl Guide movement grew up (1956) with Alix Liddell and Elizabeth Hill. Illustrated by Jennetta Vise.

Awards
 1975 – Awarded MBE for services to the Girl Guides Association
 Awarded the Silver Fish Award, Girl Guiding's highest award for adults, for encouraging the movement overseas.

References

1904 births
1992 deaths
Recipients of the Silver Fish Award
Girlguiding
Girlguiding officials
Officers of the Order of the British Empire
Girl Guiding and Girl Scouting